The Saab Trackfire is a Remote Weapon Station (RWS), i.e. a remotely operated weaponized system that can be fitted with either medium or light caliber weapons. It can be mounted to vehicles, ships and stationary platforms. It is manufactured by Saab Group.

Operators

Hamina-class missile boat
Jehu-class landing craft
Pansio-class minelayer

Combat Boat 90

References

Vehicle weapons
Remote weapon stations
Saab
Goods manufactured in Sweden